Eurhynchium is a genus of mosses belonging to the family Brachytheciaceae.

The genus was first described by Bruch and Wilhelm Philippe Schimper in 1854.

The genus has cosmopolitan distribution.

Species:
 Eurhynchium angustirete
 Eurhynchium praelongum
 Eurhynchium pulchellum
 Eurhynchium striatum
 Eurhynchium swartzii

References

Hypnales
Moss genera